La Chaussée is a commune in the Seine-Maritime department in the Normandy region in northern France.

Geography

Population

Places of interest
 The church of St.Jean-Baptiste, dating from the seventeenth century.
 The sixteenth century church of Saint-Pierre at the hamlet of Bois-Hulin.

See also
Communes of the Seine-Maritime department

References

Communes of Seine-Maritime